Clube Atlético Paulistinha, usually called CAP, or Paulistinha, as they are usually called, is a currently inactive Brazilian football team from São Carlos in São Paulo state, founded on 3 August 1958.

They play in red, black and white shirts, white shorts and red socks.

History
The club was founded on August 3, 1958, by club company.

The mascot of the club is a Scrooge McDuck.

Stadium

CA Paulistinha plays their matches at Luisão Stadium, inaugurated on 3 November 1968, with a maximum capacity of 10,000 people.

Trivia
The club's mascot is a Scrooge McDuck.
CA Paulistinha is the only São Carlos's club to reach the Campeonato Paulista fourth division.

References

External links
Official website

Association football clubs established in 1958
Paulistinha
Paulistinha
1958 establishments in Brazil